Beat Huwyler is a Swiss-born Reformist theologian who taught at University of Basel. Huwyler received a Doctor of Theology degree in 1995 after completing his thesis about the Book of Jeremiah. He was editor of the evangelical magazine "Life & Faith" from 2006 to 2008. He directed a research program founded by Swiss National Science Foundation in the University of Basel. He edited the book "Easter Monday" in 2008 and wrote "Jeremiah and the People" in 1997 with articulates the criterion that changes in biblical books must be repeated and serve a discernible and unifying purpose.

Ministry

In 1991, Huwyler became Pastor in the Evangelical Reformed Church of Basel-Stadt after completed advanced theologian studies in Basel and Lucerne.

References

External links
Biografy from ref-ag.ch

Swiss Calvinist and Reformed theologians
University of Bern alumni
Academic staff of the University of Basel
20th-century Calvinist and Reformed theologians
21st-century Calvinist and Reformed theologians
1961 births
Living people